Deuriopus or Derriopos (Strabo: Δευρίοπος Deuriopos; Stephanus of Byzantium: Δουρίοπος Douriopos) was a subdivision of Paionia, in what is today North Macedonia. Its exact limits are unclear, but it is known that it contained lands around the river Crna (ancient Erigonus). The towns Bryanium (Bruanion in ancient Greek) and Styberra (also known as Stuberrha) (near today's Prilep) were located in Deuriopus. According to Livy, Philip V of Macedon founded the city of Perseis in Deuriopus, named after his eldest son, Perseus.

After the defeat in the Battle of Pydna in 168 BCE, Macedonia was severely punished and reduced to a Roman province when also Perseida as a town must have been quickly renamed to Deuriopus, to carry the same name as the whole region of Deuriopus. There is a stone with inscription said to be found on the site of Styberra, erected there with the aim to commemorate a donation of 1500 denari, by Philip, who was a politarch of Deuriopus, i.e. an elected governor of the town during the Roman era of Macedonia.

References

Bibliography

External links
Current locations of Deuriopus region

Geography of ancient Paeonia